Computerized neuropsychological assessment helps neuropsychologists and psychologists to assess functions relative to possible brain damage using a software.
For more information about the tests, see Neuropsychological tests.

Available packages

Currently there are some commercial packages available for buying. Once bought, they can be installed at a clinic and be used to assess patients.

Computerized versus traditional tests

There are some discussions on the effectiveness of computerized tests.
The detriments in using computerized versions are discussed in an article.

Computerized tests have the following main benefits:

Speed
Results are obtained as soon as the tests are finished – no need to consult tables or other informations.

Security
Every rule is programmed in the software, so there will be no errors during the execution or getting the results.

Hemispheric Asymmetry

To assess different hemispheric functions, some packages offer verbal and non verbal tests. These tests are applied according to Neuropsychological tests.

Development at Universities

By having clinical applications, some universities develop their own packages, like University of Cambridge (CANTAB - Cambridge Neuropsychological Test Automated Battery ) and Universidade Federal de São Paulo (NAFW - Neuropsychological Assessment Framework , LAACS - Lateralized Attention Assessment Computerized System  and ThoughtFlow-Sys ).

List of software
ThoughtFlow-Sys
NAFW - Neuropsychological Assessment Framework
LAACS - Lateralized Attention Assessment Computerized System

References

 CANTAB
 LAACS
 NAFW
 UNIFESP-DIS

External links
Ethical issues in the use of computerized assessment
Sources of error in computerized neuropsychological assessment

Health informatics
Neurophysiology